Getk is a village in the Akhuryan Municipality of the Shirak Province of Armenia. Statistical Committee of Armenia reported its population was 601 in 2010, up from 574 at the 2001 census.

Demographics
The population of the village since 1897 is as follows:

References 

Communities in Shirak Province
Populated places in Shirak Province